Chuquisaca may refer to:

Chuquisaca Department, a department of Bolivia in the center south
Chuquisaca Revolution, a popular uprising on 25 May 1809
Alliance for Chuquisaca, an electoral alliance in Chuquisaca created in May 2010